Ibiúna is a municipality in the state of São Paulo in Brazil. It is part of the Metropolitan Region of Sorocaba. The population is 79,479 (2020 est.) in an area of 1058.08 km2. The elevation is 860 m.

Location

Located in the middle of a valley, its main economical activity/resources are provided from agriculture (developed by the hundreds of Japanese immigrants established there) and the city has been recently turned to a tourist city a few years ago. The whole Ibiuna territory encompasses rainforests, bushes, and hundreds of kilometers of native vegetation and wildlife.

The municipality contains part of the  Serra do Mar Environmental Protection Area, created in 1984.
It also contains part of the  Jurupará State Park, created in 1992.

People

The population is mostly situated outside the metropolitan area (15,000 inhabitants in the city and approximately 65,000 in the suburbs) and is a mix of Portuguese Colonialists descendants, Italians, Germans and Africans — as mostly any part of the country, Ibiuna is a mix of races and cultures. Once a year, the city held the famous "São Sebastian festival" party celebrated for nearly a century to reaffirm the faith of town's divine intervention by St. Sebastian during a Spanish influenza epidemic (the celebration occurs every year during the last weekend of May).

References

External links
 http://www.ibiuna.com.br Site da cidade de Ibiúna
 https://web.archive.org/web/20070625042950/http://www.guiasaoroque.com.br/ibiuna/ibiuna.htm About Ibiúna
 EncontraIbiúna - Find everything about Ibiúna city.

Municipalities in São Paulo (state)